The Dharug or Darug people, formerly known as the Broken Bay tribe, are an Aboriginal Australian people, who share strong ties of kinship and, in pre-colonial times, lived as skilled hunters in family groups or clans, scattered throughout much of what is modern-day Sydney.

The Dharug, originally a Western Sydney people, were bounded by the Kuringgai to the northeast around Broken Bay, the Darkinjung to the north, the Wiradjuri to the west on the eastern fringe of the Blue Mountains, the Gandangara to the southwest in the Southern Highlands, the Eora to the east and the Tharawal to the southeast in the Illawarra area.

Darug language

The Dharug language, now not commonly spoken, is generally considered one of two dialects, the other being the language spoken by the neighbouring Eora, constituting a single language. The word myall, a pejorative word in Australian dialect denoting any Aboriginal person who kept up a traditional way of life, originally came from the Dharug language term mayal, which denoted any person hailing from another tribe.

Country
Norman Tindale reckoned Dharug lands as encompassing , taking in the mouth of the Hawkesbury River, and running inland as far as Mount Victoria. It took in the areas around Campbelltown, Liverpool, Camden, Penrith and Windsor.

Social organisation
Traditionally, there was a cultural divide between the western Dharug and the Eora, whom they call the coastal Dharug, katungal or "sea people". They built canoes, and their diet was primarily seafood, including fish and shellfish from Sydney Harbour, Botany Bay and their associated rivers. The inland Dharug were paiendra or "tomahawk people". They hunted kangaroos, emus and other land animals, and used stone axes more extensively.

Clans
The Dharug nation was divided up into a number of woodland clans who each tended to live in a certain geographic area. This geographic area would also house descendant clans. Each clan typically included 50 to 100 people. According to James Kohen, they numbered 15:

 (1) Bediagal
 (2) Bididal
 (3) Boolbainora
 (4) Burreberongal
 (5) Burramattagal
 (6) Cabragal
 (7) Cannemegal
 (8) Cattai
 (9) Gommerigal
 (10) Kurrajong
 (11) Mulgoa
 (12) Murringong
 (13) Tugagal
 (14) Wandeandegal
 (15) Warrawarry

History of contact
Smallpox, introduced in 1789 by the British settlers, wiped out up to 90% of the population in some areas. They lived in the natural caves and overhangs in the sandstone of the Hawksbury region, although some did choose to make huts out of bark, sticks and branches.

Recent controversy
A strong centre of cultural attachment for the Dharug people has been the "Blacks Town" (at the modern suburb of Colebee) in the Blacktown local government area. However, in September 2012 the City of Blacktown decided to cease recognising the Dharug people as the traditional owners of the area. The council also passed a motion, opposed by some councillors, to begin a process to consider changing the name "Blacktown". An online petition was launched calling for the recognition of the Dharug people in 2012.

In 2020, the Hills Shire Council, whose local government area covers Dharug land, caused controversy by rejecting requests to include an Acknowledgement of Country at its meetings. The Hills Shire Council is the only Sydney local council that does not include an Acknowledgement of Country at its meetings.

Notable Dharug people

 Kurtley Beale, Australian professional rugby union player
 Anthony Fernando, early twentieth century activist
 Daniel Moowattin, third Australian Aboriginal person to visit England
 Marion Leane Smith, only Australian Aboriginal woman known to have served in the First World War
 Yarramundi, Boorooberongal clansman, whose daughter Maria Lock and son Colebee have a significant role in early assimilation history
 Maria Lock, Aboriginal Australian landowner in colonial times

Alternative names
 Broken Bay tribe
 Dharruk, Dharrook, Dhar'rook, Darrook, Dharug
Source:

See also
 Wangal
 Eora

Notes

Citations

Sources

External links 
 Bibliography of Dharug people and language resources, at the Australian Institute of Aboriginal and Torres Strait Islander Studies
 Dharug clan names – website Our Black and White family. Lists different clan names from above, and says "Our language group is EORA". (Lists Wategora, among others.)

Aboriginal peoples of New South Wales
The Hills Shire
Sydney